
The following is a list of Playboy Playmates of 2015. Playboy magazine names their Playmate of the Month each month throughout the year.

January

Brittny Ward is a model and the Playboy Playmate of the Month for January 2015. Ward is a former beauty pageant competitor and has been modeling since age 12 when her mother submitted her photos to a modeling agency. Her modeling experience includes a TransWorld Surf competition and working with the UFC. On June 12, 2018, Ward got engaged to British Car Racing Driver Jenson Button who is also a 2009 Formula One World Champion, after two years of dating.

February

Kayslee Don Collins is an American singer-songwriter, musician, model and actress, as well as the Playboy Playmate of the Month for February 2015. Her pictorial was shot by Josh Ryan.

March

Chelsie Aryn Miller is a model and the Playboy Playmate of the Month for March 2015. Prior to being selected as a Playmate, Miller was selected as Playboy's Miss Social for March 2011. Her interest in modeling began in high school when she started posting photos taken by her mother, an amateur photographer, on MySpace and began to gain a fanbase. Miller states that her parents, teachers, and high school cheerleading coaches encouraged her to pursue modeling. She has also modeled for Super Street Bikes, Cookie for Him, and NY Rider magazines. Miller is represented by Nista Models, a New York-based modeling agency that specialized in petite size models.

Miller is of Japanese and German descent. According to her Playboy profile, she enjoys listening to country music and is interested in vintage cars and motorcycles. She also revealed that she wanted to be a Playmate since her teens, stating "I scoured my dad's Playboys and was blown away by how drop-dead gorgeous the girls were. I wanted to be part of their family." Miller plans to attend college to study early childhood education.

April

Alexandra Tyler Abercrombie is a model and the Playboy Playmate of the Month for April 2015.

Encouraged by her mother, Tyler attended an open casting call in Los Angeles while still in high school. After signing with a modeling agency, Tyler wished to pursue modeling full-time. She then accelerated her studies and finished high school a year early. After moving to Los Angeles, she landed campaigns with L'Oréal and Volcom. While in high school, Tyler was a cheerleader and aspired to one day become a special-ed teacher.

May

Brittany Rene Brousseau is a model and actress. She was the Playboy Playmate of the Month for May 2015. She appeared in the film Joe Dirt 2: Beautiful Loser in 2015.

June

Kaylia Cassandra is a model and the Playmate of the Month for June 2015. Cassandra was a successful fitness model prior to deciding to test for Playboy at Studio West in California. She currently lives in Etters, Pennsylvania where she is attending college.

July

Kayla Rae Reid (born July 5, 1991) is a model and the Playboy Playmate of the Month for July 2015.

August

Dominique Jane Sharpe is a model and the Playboy Playmate of the Month for August 2015.

September

Monica Lee Sims is a model and the Playboy Playmate of the Month for September 2015.

October

Ana Cheri Garcia is a model and the Playboy Playmate of the Month for October 2015.

November

Rachel Tiare Harris is an artist and the Playboy Playmate of the Month for November 2015. She is from Pasadena, California and was born in Los Angeles County.

December

Eugena Washington is a fashion model, contestant (second runner-up) of America's Next Top Model (cycle 7). She is also
the Playboy Playmate of the Month for December 2015 and the Playmate of the Year 2016.

See also
 List of people in Playboy 2010–2019

References 

 2015
Playmates of 2015
2015-related lists